Pildammsparken (Willowpond Park) is a neighbourhood and park in Malmö, Sweden, founded for the Baltic Exhibition of 1914. It covers an area of 45 hectares.

References

Neighbourhoods of Malmö
Parks in Malmö
World's fair sites in Sweden